"Halfway Down" is a poem by A.A. Milne, included in the 1924 collection When We Were Very Young. A "juvenile meditation", Zena Sutherland comments in Children & Books that both the poem and Ernest Shepard's illustration "has caught the mood of suspended action that is always overtaking small children on stairs." Christopher Robin, the child in Milne's Winnie the Pooh stories, is the presumed narrator of the poem.

"Halfway Down the Stairs"
A song was created from the poem by Harold Fraser-Simson, who put many of Milne's poems to music.

"Halfway Down the Stairs" was used in the first season of The Muppet Show. The performance was staged in the middle of a flight of stairs, and became the most significant performance of the season for Kermit the Frog's nephew Robin the Frog. The sequence was reshot for a few different countries' broadcast of the tenth episode, with guest Harvey Korman.

The song was included on the LP The Muppet Show, later released separately reaching #7 on the UK Singles Chart in 1977. The sequence was refilmed for inclusion in Top of the Pops. The track was also included on the CD The Best of The Muppets and the VHS Playhouse Video: Children's Songs and Stories.

Jerry Nelson, who served as Robin the Frog's performer, sang the song at Jim Henson's memorial service during a segment where various Muppet performers sang Henson's favorite songs as their characters.

Rowlf the Dog sang a cover of this song in his album, Ol' Brown Ears is Back. American singer Amy Lee of the band Evanescence sang a cover of the song which was included on the 2011 album Muppets: The Green Album.

A cover of this song was sung in the Family Guy episode You Can't Handle the Booth!. In the episode, Peter gets stuck in the bannister slats of his staircase and dejectedly sings the song to pass the time.

Text

References

1924 poems
1977 singles
British poems
The Muppets songs
Poetry by A. A. Milne
Songs based on poems